Frank Plicka (11 June 1926 – 9 December 2010 in Sydney, Australia) is a Czech-born Australian photographer, best known for his book Streets of Sydney, an extraordinary tour of Sydney, documented in black & white photographs taken over the last 30 years. This book depicts life in, and around Sydney streets, pubs, bars, galleries, and beaches.

Biography
Plicka was born in 1926 in the mining town of Kladno, former Czechoslovakia. His father was a miner, often unemployed and as many others at that time, could not give the family a decent living.

Starting a primary school meant a new happy life for Plicka. He finished school with best possible results, skipped high school and was enrolled in an elite school "Real Gymnasium" in 1937. After World War II, during which Czech universities were closed, he continued his studies at Charles University of Prague and graduated as a pedagog. Then until 1968, he was involved in sports professionally, coaching top Czech swimmers. In 1967, he was awarded a title Coach of the Year.

In 1968, after the Warsaw Pact invasion of Czechoslovakia, he fled to Australia. He settled in Sydney, taking different jobs at different places, and started concentrating on street photography.

Besides Australia, he photographed one year in Africa (1970s) and three years in Asia (1980s). During the last 35 years, he finished three books. At present, only Streets of Sydney has been published.

During recent years, Plicka held several exhibitions in Sydney, but prefers private life and does not seek wider recognition.

Work

From early age, Plicka was involved in sports and his desire to catch all moments led him to sports photography. As a sports photographer, he photographed in six European countries, including Russia.

His trademark is candid black-and-white photography. He has been using different cameras during 65 years of work, but since 1952, he has been using Leica cameras, mainly his favourite Leica M3. He uses 35 mm and 50 mm lenses for his work.

Plicka has been processing his photos on his own from his beginnings. He changed from darkroom to digital/computer processing in 2004.

Works

References

1926 births
2010 deaths
Australian photographers
Czech photographers
Czechoslovak emigrants to Australia
People from Kladno
Charles University alumni